UGATUSAT was a Russian nanosatellite which was built and operated by Ufa State Aviation Technical University (UGATU). The satellite was intended to be used as a technology demonstrator, and for Earth observation. The development programme was budgeted at around 155M Roubles (£3.75M/$7.25M). It was originally intended to launch atop a Kosmos-3M carrier rocket from LC-107 at Kapustin Yar on 19 June 2009, but was later transferred to a later launch as a secondary payload on a Soyuz-2 rocket. UGATUSAT was launched into orbit on 17 September 2009. Shortly after launch, UGATUSAT's gyroscopic control system suffered a structural failure, which led to the failure of the entire spacecraft. This failure led to extensive delays and redesigns for the Baumanets-2 satellite, which shared common components with UGATUSAT. UGATUSAT's demise was part of a string of in-space failures of Russian satellites noted by outside observers in the late 2000s.

References

Education in Ufa
Student satellites
Spacecraft launched in 2009
Spacecraft launched by Soyuz-2 rockets